The 1942 West Virginia Mountaineers football team was an American football team that represented West Virginia University as an independent during the 1942 college football season. In its third season under head coach Bill Kern, the team compiled a 5–4 record and outscored opponents by a total of 119 to 91. The team played its home games at Mountaineer Field in Morgantown, West Virginia. Richard McElwee was the team captain.

Schedule

References

West Virginia
West Virginia Mountaineers football seasons
West Virginia Mountaineers football